was a Japanese painter, illustrator and photographer perhaps best known for his paintings and drawings of women in bondage such as his illustrations for a Japanese edition of Lewis Carroll's Alice in Wonderland.  The musical performer Momus released a song about his work entitled "The Cabinet of Kuniyoshi Kaneko". In 1991 Kaneko provided the artwork for Alice: An Interactive Museum click-and-go adventure game. In 1992 his work was included in Adam and Eve an exhibition at the Saitama Kenritsu Kindai Bijutsukan (Museum of Modern Art) in Saitama.  Kuniyoshi died of heart failure on March 17, 2015 at the age of 78.

References

1936 births
2015 deaths
Japanese artists
Artists from Saitama Prefecture